Har du glömt is a 1976 studio album from Swedish "dansband" Wizex. It peaked at number 30 on the Swedish Albums Chart. The song "Cowboy Yoddle Song" became a minor breakthrough for the group's singer Kikki Danielsson.

Track listing

Side 1

Side 2

Charts

References

External links
 Svenska dansband

1976 albums
Wizex albums